
Werner von Erdmannsdorff (27 July 1891 – 5 June 1945) was a general in the Wehrmacht during World War II.  He was a recipient of the Knight's Cross of the Iron Cross. He was married to Helene née von Tschirsky und Bögendorff (1895–1982).

As last commander of the LXXXXI Army Corps in Yugoslavia, Erdmannsdorff surrendered to the British troops in May 1945.

He was extradited to Yugoslavia and murdered without trial on 5 June 1945 by Yugoslav partisans in Ljubljana, alongside generals Gustav Fehn (XV Mountain Corps), Friedrich Stephan (104th Jäger Division) and Heinz Kattner (Feldkommandant of Sarajevo).

He was the older brother of general Gottfried von Erdmannsdorff, who himself would be hanged in Minsk in January 1946 for war crimes.

Awards and decorations

 Knight's Cross of the Iron Cross on 8 March 1942 as Oberst and commander of Infanterie-Regiment 30 (mot.)

References

Citations

Bibliography

 
 
 

1891 births
1945 deaths
Executed people from Saxony
German Army generals of World War II
Generals of Infantry (Wehrmacht)
People from the Kingdom of Saxony
German Army personnel of World War I
Recipients of the clasp to the Iron Cross, 1st class
Recipients of the Gold German Cross
Recipients of the Knight's Cross of the Iron Cross
People from Bautzen
Executed military leaders
German people executed abroad
People executed by Yugoslavia by firing squad
People extradited to Yugoslavia
Military personnel from Saxony
Reichswehr personnel
People killed by Yugoslav Partisans
Extrajudicial killings in World War II